The 2019 BBVA Open Ciudad de Valencia was a professional tennis tournament played on outdoor clay courts. It was the fourth edition of the tournament which was part of the 2019 ITF Women's World Tennis Tour. It took place in Valencia, Spain between 23 and 29 September 2019.

Singles main-draw entrants

Seeds

 1 Rankings are as of 16 September 2019.

Other entrants
The following players received wildcards into the singles main draw:
  Sara Errani
  Eva Guerrero Álvarez
  Claudia Hoste Ferrer
  Helene Pellicano

The following player received entry as a special exempt:
  Irene Burillo Escorihuela

The following players received entry from the qualifying draw:
  Marie Benoît
  Nicoleta Dascălu
  Andrea Gámiz
  Daria Mishina
  Guiomar Maristany
  Mayar Sherif
  Rosa Vicens Mas
  Maryna Zanevska

Champions

Singles

 Varvara Gracheva def.  Tamara Korpatsch, 3–6, 6–2, 6–0

Doubles

 Irina Bara /  Rebeka Masarova def.  Andrea Gámiz /  Seone Mendez, 6–4, 7–6(7–2)

References

External links
 2019 BBVA Open Ciudad de Valencia at ITFtennis.com
 Official website

2019 ITF Women's World Tennis Tour
2019 in Spanish sport
September 2019 sports events in Spain